Jan Krasnowolski (born 10 September 1972 in Krakow, Poland) is a Polish crime writer. 

In 2006, he settled in Bournemouth, UK.

Books
9 łatwych kawałków, 2001. Zielona Sowa, Cracow
Klatka, 2006. Korporacja Ha!art, Cracow
Afrykańska elektronika, 2013. Korporacja Ha!art, Cracow
Syreny z Broadmoor, 2017. Świat Książki, Warszawa
Czas wilków, czas psów, 2019. Świat Książki, Warszawa

References

External links

1972 births
Living people
Polish crime writers